Jakob Stenqvist (born March 17, 1998) is a Swedish professional ice hockey player. He is currently playing for Timrå IK in the Swedish Hockey League (SHL). He was selected by the Dallas Stars in the sixth-round, 176th overall, of the 2016 NHL Entry Draft.

Playing career
Stenqvist previously played with Ässät Pori of the Finnish Liiga. After two seasons in the Liiga, Stenqvist moved to the Kontinental Hockey League (KHL) as a free agent and agreed to a one-year contract with Russian club, Severstal Cherepovets, on 1 May 2021.

Following the conclusion of his contract with Severstal, Stenqvist left the KHL and returned to the SHL in agreeing to a one-year deal with Timrå IK on 26 April 2022.

References

External links

1998 births
Living people
Ässät players
IF Björklöven players
Dallas Stars draft picks
Frölunda HC players
Modo Hockey players
People from Mora Municipality
Severstal Cherepovets players
Sportspeople from Dalarna County
Swedish ice hockey players
Swedish expatriate ice hockey players in Finland
Timrå IK players